Rushing is the surname of:

 Allison Jones Rushing (born 1982), American judge
 Byron Rushing (born 1942), American politician
 Jimmy Rushing (1901–1972), American singer featured in Count Basie's Orchestra from 1935 to 1948
 John Rushing (1972–2020), American football coach
 Laurie Rushing (born 1968), American politician
 Marion Rushing (1936–2013), American football player
 Randy Rushing (born 1963), American politician
 Sandra Rushing, American basketball coach
 T. J. Rushing (born 1983), American football coach and former player